BBS TV (BBS 1) is the first television channel of Bhutan. It is a Dzongkha and English channel that broadcasts news and current affairs, education, sports, and culture. Owned by the Bhutan Broadcasting Service.

References

Television stations in Bhutan
Television channels and stations established in 1999
Television channels and stations established in 2015
Television channels and stations established in 2010
1999 establishments in Bhutan